The 1992 Chicago Marathon was the 15th running of the annual marathon race in Chicago, United States and was held on October 25. The elite men's race was won by Brazil's José Cesar de Souza in a time of 2:16:14 hours and the women's race was won by home athlete Linda Somers in 2:37:41.

Results

Men

Women

References

Results. Association of Road Racing Statisticians. Retrieved 2020-04-10.

External links 
 Official website

Chicago Marathon
Chicago
1990s in Chicago
1992 in Illinois
Chicago Marathon
Chicago Marathon